The following is a list of Iranian painters.

Classical era

Classical Persian painter
 Kamaleddin Behzad
 Reza Abbasi
 Farrukh Beg
 Mihr 'Ali

Modern era

A 
 Aghapour, Shahla
 Aghdashloo, Aydin
 Alikhanzadeh, Samira (1967– ), painter
 Alivandi, Bahram
 Arabshahi, Massoud (1935–2019), painter
 Aram, Kamrooz (1978– ), painter
 Siah Armajani, conceptual artist

B 
 Bakhshpour, Jamal
 Behzad, Hossein
 Borbor, Dariush

D 
 Delara Darabi
 Iran Darroudi
 Mir Abdolrez Daryabeigi
 Ali Divandari
 Bijan Daneshmand

E 
 Abolhassan Etessami (1903–1978), architect, calligrapher, painter, and novelist
 Zohreh Etezad ol-Saltan, artist, painter, carpet weaver

F 
 Amir H. Fallah (1979– ), Iranian born, American painter based in Los Angeles
Monir Shahroudy Farmanfarmaian
 Farshchian, Mahmouad (1930– )

G 
 Ghanbari, Mokarrameh (1928–2005), heuristic and self made painter
 Ghandriz, Mansoor, painter
 Marcos Grigorian, painter

H 
 Raoof Haghighi
 Fariba Hajamadi 
 Khosrow Hassanzadeh
 Haydar Hatemi
 Mansooreh Hosseini
 Mehdi Hosseini

J 
 Pouran Jinchi

K 
 Abbas Katouzian
 Kamal-ol-Molk
 keikhosro khoroush
 Kazemi, Zhaleh (1944–2005), painter, news anchor, and producer
 Shokoufeh Kavani
 Khodadadi, Reza

L 
 Farideh Lashai (1944– ), painter

M 
 Iman Maleki
 Leyly Matine-Daftary (1937–2007), modernist painter, educator
 Farshid Mesghali (1943– ), graphic designer, illustrator, and author
 Mohsen Vaziri-Moghaddam (1924–2018), painter and professor of art
 Farhad Moshiri
 Noreen Motamed
 Mir-Hossein Mousavi (1941– ), painter, architect and politician

N 
 Naderi Yeganeh, Hamid (1990– ), Iranian mathematical artist
 Afshin Naghouni  (1969-), Iranian-British visual artist
 Neshat, Shirin (1957– ), Iranian-American artist, photographer and filmmaker
 Nodjoumi, Nicky (1942– ), Iranian-American painter
 Nouri, Mina (1951– ), Iranian painter, and printmaker
 Novin, Guity (1944– ), Iranian-Canadian figurative painter, and graphic designer
 Nuri, Hossein (1954– ), Iranian painter, dramaturge, and filmmaker

O 
 Kazem Ordoobadi (1919–2002), painter

P 

 Kour Pour (1987– ), Iranian-British painter, printmaker

R 
 Shokouh Riazi (1921–1965), modernist painter

S 
 Gholamhossein Saber (born 1941), painter and photographer
 Sadeghi, Ali Akbar (1937– ), painter
 Sadeghi Amini, Farhad
 Sadr, Behjat
 Salimi, Homayoun (1948– ), painter and academic
 Samad, Khwaja Abdus (16th century), painter and one of the founders of the Mughal school of painting in India
 Sohrab Sepehri
 Shafrazi, Tony
 Shahrokh, Naz (born 1969 )
 Keyvan Shovir (born 1985), Iranian-born American graffiti artist

T 
 Amir Shayesteh Tabar (1967– ), painter and poet 
 Towhidi Tabari (1964– ), painter and Persian style illuminator
 Jazeh Tabatabai (1931–2008), avant-garde painter, poet, and sculptor
 Taravat Talepasand (1979– ), Iranian American painter, sculptor
 Mohammad Ali Taraghijah
 Parviz Tanavoli, sculptor

V 
 Mohsen Vaziri-Moghaddam

Z 
 Zenderoudi, Hossein (1937– ), painter and sculptor
 Ziapour, Jalil

Notes 

 
Iranian
Painters